Founéké Sy (21 July 1986 – 4 April 2020) was a Malian footballer.

Club career
Sy played his entire career in the Malian Première Division before moving to Iran in 2009. He played for Nassaji Mazandaran and Iranjavan in Azadegan League. After having two good seasons in Iran's first division league, He joined Pro League team Sanat Naft. In 2011–12 of Iran Pro League he became second best goal-scorer of the season.

International career
In 2009, Sy featured for the Mali national football team in their World Cup qualifying match against Sudan.

Death
On 5 April 2020, it was announced that Sy had died in a car crash.

Career statistics

Assists

References

1986 births
2020 deaths
Association football forwards
Malian footballers
Expatriate footballers in Iran
Nassaji Mazandaran players
Djoliba AC players
Mali international footballers
AS Korofina players
JS Centre Salif Keita players
Iranjavan players
Sanat Naft Abadan F.C. players
Ajman Club players
Al-Ittihad Kalba SC players
Masafi Club players
Persian Gulf Pro League players
Azadegan League players
UAE Pro League players
UAE First Division League players
21st-century Malian people
Road incident deaths in Mali